The Vauvise is a  long river in the Cher department in central France. Its source is at Nérondes. It flows generally north. It is a left tributary of the Loire, into which it flows at Saint-Satur, near Sancerre.

Communes along its course
This list is ordered from source to mouth: Nérondes, Chassy, Laverdines, Villequiers, Couy, Garigny, Jussy-le-Chaudrier, Précy, Sancergues, Saint-Martin-des-Champs, Herry, Feux, Saint-Bouize, Thauvenay, Ménétréol-sous-Sancerre, Sancerre, Saint-Satur

References

Rivers of France
Rivers of Centre-Val de Loire
Rivers of Cher (department)